The Bridge is a 1997 sculpture by Thornton Dial. It is located at John Lewis Plaza in Freedom Park in Atlanta, Georgia at the intersection of Ponce de Leon Avenue with Freedom Parkway in the Poncey-Highland neighborhood. The work portrays "congressman John Lewis' lifelong quest for civil and human rights" and the community's "valiant efforts to stop the road and preserve intown neighborhoods".

See also
 Selma to Montgomery marches
 Civil rights movement in popular culture

References

Landmarks in Atlanta
Outdoor sculptures in Georgia (U.S. state)
1997 sculptures
Sculptures in Atlanta
Steel sculptures in Georgia (U.S. state)
1997 establishments in Georgia (U.S. state)
Bridges in art